The Montreal flood of 1987 happened on July 14 of that year when a series of strong thunderstorms crossed the island of Montreal, Canada, between the noon hour and 2:30 p.m. Over  of rain fell during this very short period of time. The sewer systems were overwhelmed by the deluge and the city was paralyzed by the flooded roads.  Autoroute 15, a sunken highway also known as the Décarie Expressway, soon filled with water, trapping motorists. Some 350,000 houses lost electricity, and tens of thousands had flooded basements. Two people died, one in a submerged car and another who was electrocuted.

Meteorological situation 

A heat wave had been affecting the province of Quebec, Canada, for over a week. During the evening of July 13, a northeast to southwest cold front approached the Montreal region from Ontario and triggered isolated severe thunderstorms.

Initial analysis 

The map on the left shows the meteorological situation at 1200 UTC of the morning of July 14, 1987 (0800 local). The cold front at the border between Ontario and Quebec is supported by an intensifying barometric trough at 500 mb, and a low pressure is developing at the surface, just southwest of Ottawa, Ontario. Cumulonimbus with high tops were easily forming in the moist, humid and unstable air mass near the ground while drier air was cooling the air in the mid-tropospheric levels. A wind divergence at the upper level and a convergence near the surface, due to the low pressure, was helping to organize the deep convection.

There was a thick layer of clouds northwest of Montreal, near the frontal zone, but only a thin layer of low clouds further southeast.

Development 

The surface low deepened as the day progressed and moved very slowly. Rising temperatures and breaking of the low clouds meant that cumulonimbus developed along the clouds’ edge when the dry air at the upper level reached extreme southwestern Quebec. By noon, conditions deteriorated quickly to thunderstorms and heavy rain showers.

The weather radar loop on the right shows that a series of four thunderstorms, noted A to D, crossed the Island of Montreal from Valleyfield to Sorel. These affected roughly the same area from 1620 UTC (12:20 pm local) to 1830 UTC (2:30 pm local). Three times, these intensities reached above , indicating the possibility of severe downbursts and hail. Some trees were uprooted and large hail reported locally but it is the amount of rain left by the thunderstorms that marked the event.

Impact 
Heavy rain affected all of the Island of Montreal. However the highest amounts were recorded around the Mont-Royal and downtown areas.

The flood's return period was estimated to be at least 50 years. Lightning and wind caused widespread power outages which in turn stopped the pumping system from evacuating the excess water from low lying roads and underpasses. Décarie expressway, a sunken highway, rapidly filled with water descending from access roads and soon became a river. Thousands of motorists were trapped and had to be rescued by firefighters and truckers with higher-clearance vehicles. An 80-year-old man drowned and another person died of electrocution.

Nearly  households lost electrical power,  to  houses and businesses were flooded causing an estimated C$220 million in damages (not adjusted for inflation). Traffic was paralyzed for hours as most streets and roads had flooded areas. Montreal Metro, buses and suburban train service were stopped. The basement of an elderly care hospital in the Saint-Henri neighbourhood was flooded and 240 patients were left without electricity, food, and health services for a while.

Long-term impact 

Most home insurance claims were declined unless the insured was specifically covered by a clause concerning flood. However, the car owners were covered. The Quebec government promised monetary help but only 20 to 40% of the expected C$40 million was ever distributed. Court cases against the municipal authorities, including a class action, were rejected as the flood was considered in legal terms an Act of God.

In 1988, all the cities on the Island of Montreal, regrouped into the Montreal Urban Community, set up a common Emergencies Coordination Bureau (Bureau des mesures d'urgence). In 1997, the bureau was renamed Centre de sécurité civile. Following the Municipal reorganization in Quebec in 2002, most of the cities were regrouped into the greater Montreal and the center became the Centre de sécurité civile de Montréal.

See also 
 Saguenay flood
 2011 Lake Champlain and Richelieu River floods

References

External links 

 News report from Radio-Canada on July 14th, 1987
 

History of Montreal
July 1987 events in Canada
Floods in Canada
Environmental issues with water
1987 natural disasters
Natural disasters in Quebec
1980s in Montreal
1987 in Quebec
1987 disasters in Canada